Baltinovsky is a rural locality (a khutor) in Bespalovskoye Rural Settlement, Uryupinsky District, Volgograd Oblast, Russia. The population was 11 as of 2010.

Geography 
Baltinovsky is located 48 km northwest of Uryupinsk (the district's administrative centre) by road. Bespalovsky is the nearest rural locality.

References 

Rural localities in Uryupinsky District